Matt Hobby (born January 18, 1985) is an American actor and comedian, known for his portrayals of Pastor Jeff in Young Sheldon, Philip in the HBO television series Boardwalk Empire, Rudy Truitt in Hart of Dixie and Pat Landy in The Grinder.

Career
He began his acting career in 2008 when he played a character in the direct-to-DVD film The Cult of Sincerity.

He has appeared in television series such as Mom, Don't Trust the B**** in Apartment 23, Onion SportsDome and Fresh Off the Boat. He appeared as Rudy Truitt in the drama series Hart of Dixie for ten episodes. He also played Philip, a servant (later butler) of the Thompson House, in the HBO series Boardwalk Empire.

Hobby played the role of Pastor Jeff Difford, a pastor of the church in the CBS television series Young Sheldon. For the first two seasons, he was a recurring character, but he was promoted to the main cast, starting with the third season. Hobby's real life wife, Mary Grill, portrays his character's new wife in the show.

In 2022, Matt started the popular podcast, Pay or Request, co-hosted with writer and comedian Joe Schiappa.

Personal life
Hobby is married to actress Mary Grill. The couple have twin sons named Ernie and Lyle.

Filmography

Film

Television

References

External links
 
 

American male film actors
American male television actors
American male voice actors
American male comedians
Male actors from Arizona
People from Phoenix, Arizona
21st-century American male actors
Living people
1985 births